Gozen (御前) is a Japanese term meaning "young lady" or "young lord". It is sometimes applied as a title for female warrior samurai. It may refer to:

Japanese women
 Aya-Gozen (1524–1609), first wife of Japanese clan leader Nagao Masakage and mother of daimyō Uesugi Kagekatsu
 Hangaku Gozen,
 Shizuka Gozen (1165–1211), Japanese court dancer and mistress of Minamoto no Yoshitsune
 Tokiwa Gozen (1123–c. 1180), Japanese noblewoman, mother of Minamoto no Yoshitsune
 Tomoe Gozen (c. 1157–1247), female, possibly fictional, samurai warrior, a concubine of Minamoto no Yoshinaka
 Tsuchida Gozen (died 1594), wife of warlord Oda Nobuhide and mother of warlord Oda Nobunaga
Fujishiro Gozen (16th-century), female samurai warrior and ruler of Fujishiro castle.
Oni Gozen (16th-century), female warrior from Hoashi clan in Kyushu.

Other
 Gozen or Goose Van Schaick (1736–1789), Continental Army officer in the American Revolutionary War